"Lucy" is the fifth single of the 2009 album Awake by the Christian rock band Skillet, and is the twelfth and final track on the album.

Meaning and concept 

John Cooper initially refrained from discussing the song's full meaning, stating that it has "a gist of regret where you wish you had done things differently" and "even though there's a specific story, it has a lot of interpretations that have kind of meant a lot to a lot of people already."

In November 2010, at a concert at the Target Center in Minneapolis, Cooper revealed it is about a young couple struggling with feelings of regret after an abortion. He retold this story and further explained his intent in writing the song in an Air 1 interview posted on Skillet's official website: Skillet - Lucy Story Behind The Song.

Charts

References

2009 songs
2011 singles
Skillet (band) songs
Songs about abortion
Songs written by John Cooper (musician)
Song recordings produced by Howard Benson
Atlantic Records singles
Lava Records singles
Ardent Records singles